Saturday, September 11, 2021, marked the twentieth anniversary of the September 11 attacks on the United States by Al-Qaeda, which was the deadliest terrorist attack in human history and significantly impacted American culture. A number of events were scheduled to commemorate the anniversary of the attacks.

Events and ceremonies 

 National September 11 Memorial and Museum reading of victims' names
 Flight 93 National Memorial reading of United Airlines Flight 93 victims' names

Television specials 

 ABC documentary adaptation of Fall and Rise: The Story of 9/11 by Mitchell Zuckoff.

References

September 11
Twentieth anniversary